The 2021 FIA World Rallycross Championship was the eighth season of the FIA World Rallycross Championship, an auto racing championship recognised by the Fédération Internationale de l'Automobile (FIA) as the highest class of international rallycross.

The championship was due to begin on 12 June at the Lånkebanen in Norway and end on 10 October at the Circuit de Spa-Francorchamps in Belgium; however after calendar adjustments, it began on 23 July at the Circuit de Barcelona-Catalunya in Spain and ended on 28 November at the Nürburgring in Germany.

2021 was the first season with the WRC Promoter GmbH as the championship promoter after succeeding IMG, subsequently formed Rallycross Promoter GmbH. Johan Kristoffersson won the Drivers' Championship for the fourth time. Hansen World RX Team won the Teams' Championship.

Calendar
The 2021 championship was due to be contested over 10 rounds in Europe, the Middle East, and Sub-Saharan Africa.The initial calendar was released on 16 December 2020, it included two unconfirmed slots: 1 for a round in Europe, and one for a round in the Middle East/Asia. 
On 26 March 2021, the calendar was adjusted due to the effects of COVID-19 pandemic; and the rounds in Finland, Middle East, and South Africa were removed from the calendar. On 12 May 2021; the calendar was adjusted again by cancelling World RX of Norway, postponing World RX of Sweden, and World RX of Portugal returned to the calendar as the final round.

Calendar Changes
After being cancelled due to the COVID-19 pandemic, the World RX of Benelux, World RX of Germany, World RX of France and all returned to the calendar.
After being on the 2020 calendar, then cancelled due to the COVID-19 pandemic, the World RX of Russia, World RX of Finland and World RX of Abu Dhabi were not included on the initial calendar.
The World RX of South Africa firstly returned to the initial calendar, however it was removed from the calendar after the adjustment of the calendar.
The World RX of Riga - Latvia was firstly not included in the initial calendar, it returned to the calendar after the adjustment. However, it is still subject to the contract. On the 19th of July, it was announced that the event had been expanded to a double-header weekend, bringing the total number of championship rounds to 9.
The World RX of Norway firstly returned to the initial calendar, however it was removed from the calendar in response to the COVID-19 pandemic.
The World RX of Portugal was firstly not included in the initial calendars, it returned to the calendar after the cancellation of World RX of Norway.
The World RX of Germany was originally scheduled to hold a double header for rounds 2 and 3 of the season, but was later postponed due to the circuit aiding in the disaster relief efforts following the 2021 European floods.

Series News
The FIA announced a tender process to find a new promoter to replace IMG. IMG had been the championship's promoters since its inception in 2014.
On 11 February 2021, it was announced that WRC Promoter GmbH would replace IMG as the championship's promoter, subsequently formed Rallycross Promoter GmbH on 21 April 2021.
The Supercar class was renamed RX1.
The RX2 class was discontinued. It was replaced by the electric RX2e class.

Entries

RX1

RX2e

Championship Standings
World Championship points are scored as follows:

RX1 Driver's Championship

RX1 Team's Championship

Notes

References

External links

World Rallycross Championship seasons
World Rallycross Championship
World Rallycross Championship, 2021